Donna Robinson Divine (born 1941) is the Morningstar Family Professor in Jewish Studies and Professor of Government at Smith College. She holds a B.A. from Brandeis University, 1963, and a Ph.D. from Columbia University, 1971, in Political Science. Divine has worked in the fields of Comparative Politics, Middle Eastern Politics, and Political Theory.

Divine is fluent in three of the major languages of the Middle East, Arabic, Hebrew, and Turkish.. She conducts research about the Middle East, studying both historical developments and contemporary trends.

She has written on Zionist immigration to Palestine during the British Mandate, analyzing how exile functioned as a contrast to the society created in Palestine during the period of British rule.

According to Efraim Karsh, Divine sees many common links between Zionist state building and the situation facing the Palestinians, comparing the roles of the Histadrut in Israel with that of Hamas and other voluntary bodies in the Palestinian "entity". She asserts that the Palestinians in the West Bank and Gaza "have created a more vibrant civil society than at any other time in their history".

Divine said that with their attention directed to explaining the loss of a Palestinian state in 1948, scholars have failed to appreciate Palestine's nineteenth century history as a period of significant development.

Divine is a feminist and has worked to expand women's rights and opportunities in the American academy and in the Middle East through her scholarship. 
Divine has also written and spoken about the Australian TV series A Place to Call Home. She has co-edited a book about the series that describes the impact of the series on its fans from across the globe.

Books
Women Living Change: Cross-Cultural Perspectives. Essays from the Smith College Research Project on Women and Social Change. Edited with Susan C. Bourque. Temple University Press, 1985.
 Politics and Society in Ottoman Palestine: The Arab Struggle for Survival and Power. Lynne Rienner, 1994.
 Postcolonial Theory and the Arab-Israeli Conflict. Edited with Philip Carl Salzman Routledge, 2008.
 Exiled in the Homeland, University of Texas Press, 2010.
Word Crimes: Reclaiming The Language of the Israeli-Palestinian Conflict.

Fellowships, grants, awards 
Named by Algemeiner newspaper as one of the top 100 people positively influencing Jewish life [2019].
Mandelbaum Scholar, University of Sydney, March 2017 invited back for 2020
Organizing Fellow, Kahn Institute for the Liberal Arts 2005-2006   
Academic Fellow, Foundation for the Defense of Democracies, 2003-2004   
Smith College Grant for Curriculum Development: Multicultural Curriculum Development   
Jean Picker Fellowship, 1982–1985   
Andrew Mellon Foundation Grants 1978–1980, 1981–1984. Principal Investigator, Smith Research Project on Women and Social Change   
National Endowment for the Humanities Fellowship for Senior Scholars, 1982–1983   
Social Science Research Council Grants, 1978–1979; 1982–1983   
Department of State Middle East Scholar in Residence, January 1978   
American Association of University Women Fellowship, 1976–1977   
Smith College Grants  
Israel Government Award, 1967–1968   
Fulbright-Hayes Fellowship, 1967–1968   
National Defense Foreign Language Fellowships, 1963–1967   
Columbia University Grant, 1966–1967   
Columbia University Presidential Fellow, 1965–1966   
New York State Regents Fellowship for College Teachers, 1964–1965   
Columbia University Middle East Scholar, 1964–1965   
Woodrow Wilson National Fellow, 1963–1964   
Phi Beta Kappa, 1962

Notes

References

External links

Columbia Graduate School of Arts and Sciences alumni
Brandeis University alumni
Smith College faculty
American feminists
American women political scientists
American political scientists
1941 births
Living people